Continental may refer to:

Places
 Continent, the major landmasses of Earth
 Continental, Arizona, a small community in Pima County, Arizona, US
 Continental, Ohio, a small town in Putnam County, US

Arts and entertainment
 Continental (album), an album by Saint Etienne
 Continental (card game), a rummy-style card game
 Continental (film), a 2013 film
 Continental Singers, a Christian music organization

Companies
 Continental AG, a German automotive parts and technologies manufacturer
 Continental Airlines, a former American airline
 Continental Electronics, an American radio transmitter manufacturer
 Continental Films, a German-controlled French film company during the Nazi occupation of France
 Continental Illinois, a defunct large bank 
 Continental Mortgage and Loan Company (later known as Continental, Inc.), the former name of HomeStreet Bank
 Continental Motors, Inc., a Chinese manufacturer of aircraft engines
 Continental Records, a former American record company
 Grupo Continental (Honduras), a group of companies in Honduras
 ContiGroup Companies or Continental Grain
 Continental Oil Company, the original name for ConocoPhillips

Automobile
 Continental Automobile Manufacturing Company, a defunct American automobile manufacturer in New Haven, Connecticut (1907–08)
 Continental Motors Company, a defunct American automobile engine manufacturer
 Continental Motor Car Company, a defunct American automobile manufacturer in Springfield, Illinois (1903)
 Continental Automobile Company, a defunct American automobile manufacturer in Grand Rapids, Michigan (1933–1934)
 Continental Motor Car Company, a defunct American automobile manufacturer in Chicago, Illinois (1907)
 Continental Tire, a method of affixing a spare tire to many personal luxury vehicles

Automobile models
 Bentley Continental, several generations of luxury automobiles since 1952
 Continental Mark Series, a series of popular personal luxury cars produced by the Lincoln Motor Company
 De Vaux Continental, by the Continental-De Vaux Company
 Lincoln Continental, a series of luxury cars by Lincoln
 Rolls-Royce Phantom II Continental, a version of the Rolls-Royce Phantom II

Other uses
 Continental (brand), a brand of foods used by Unilever in Australia
 Continental (currency), paper money issued by the US government during the American Revolution
 Continental, a group in the Sri Lankan grading system for the cinnamon quills

See also
 Continental Army, the unified command structure of the 13 colonies fighting Great Britain during the American Revolution
 Continental Can Company (1904–76), a United States metal container manufacturer
 Continental climate
 Continental Europe
 Continental food or Continental cuisine, European/Western-style food/cuisine
 Continental glacier
 Continental knitting
 Continental philosophy, a 20th-century school of philosophy based mostly on texts by French and German philosophers
 Continental stitch or tent stitch, a needlepoint stitch worked on canvas
 Continental tire, an upright, external spare tire mounted behind an automobile's trunk compartment
 The Continental (disambiguation)
 Hotel Continental (disambiguation)
Transcontinental (disambiguation)
Intercontinental (disambiguation)